list of institutes in Bangladesh:

State supported (public) institutes

 Army Institute of Business Administration (Army IBA)
 Bangladesh Foreign Trade Institute (BFTI)
 Bangladesh Institute of Bank Management (BIBM)
 Bangladesh Institute of Development Studies (BIDS)
 Bangladesh Institute of Governance and Management (BIGM)
 Bangladesh Institute of Management (BIM)
 Bangladesh Institute of Marine Technology (BIMT)
 Bangladesh Institute of Peace and Security Studies
 Bangladesh Institute of Sports Education (BKSP)
 Bangladesh Insurance Academy (BIA) 
 Bangladesh Marine Fisheries Academy (BMFA)
 Bangladesh Marine Academy (BMA)
 Bangladesh Planning Commission
 Bangladesh Public Administration Training Centre (BPATC) Savar, Dhaka
 Bangladesh Tea Research Institute
 BCS Administration Academy (BCSAA) Shahbag, Dhaka
 Dhaka School of Economics (DScE), Dhaka University
 Institute of Bangladesh Studies, Rajshahi University
 Institute of Business Administration (IBA), Dhaka University
 Institute of Business Administration, University of Rajshahi
 Institute of Business Administration, Jahangirnagar University
 Institute of Chartered Accountants of Bangladesh (ICAB)
 Institute of Chartered Secretaries of Bangladesh (ICSB)
 Institute of Cost and Management Accountants of Bangladesh (ICMAB)
 Institute of Education and Research (IER), Dhaka University
 Institute of Information Technology (IIT), Dhaka University
 Institute of Statistical Research and Training (ISRT), University of Dhaka
 Institute of Leather Engineering & Technology (ILET), University of Dhaka
 Institute of Business Administration, Jahangirnagar University
 Military Institute of Science and Technology (MIST)
 National Academy for Planning and Development (NAPD)
 National Institute of Preventive and Social Medicine (NIPSOM)

Public-Private-Partnership (PPP) institutes
 National Institute of Textile Engineering and Research (NITER)

Private institutes

 Bangladesh Association of Software and Information Services (BASIS)
 Bangladesh Computer Samity
 Bangladesh Health Profession Institute
 Bangladesh Institute for Professional Development (BIPD)
 Bangladesh Institute of Human Resources Management (BIHRM)
 Bangladesh Institute of Information Technology (BIIT)
 Bangladesh Institute of Management Studies (BIMS)
 Bangladesh Institute of Science and Technology
 Centre for Policy Dialogue
 Daffodil Institute of IT (DIIT)
 Haji Abul Hossain Institute of Technology
 Heritage International College of Aviation, Science and Management
 Narayanganj Institute of Islam 
 Institute of Science and Technology (IST)
 Design Academy Bangladesh
 Chartered Institute of Human Resources and Development, Bangladesh(CIHRD)
 Technical Youth Training Centre
 Bangladesh Institute of Labour Studies (BILS)

References

 
 
Institutes